Shirt Tales are characters that were created in 1980 by greeting card designer Janet Elizabeth Manco and were featured on Hallmark Cards greeting cards. The characters were adapted into a 1982-1985 animated series for television, by Hanna-Barbera Productions, which aired on NBC.

Cards
Hallmark Cards released the homonymous line of greeting cards with animal characters wearing T-shirts upon which was a message. Those cards were among Hallmark's best sellers at that time, which led the company to team with Hanna-Barbera Productions to adapt the Shirt Tales into a Saturday morning cartoon, which premiered on NBC on September 18, 1982. The card line remained, but it faded shortly after the show left broadcast television in 1985.

TV series
The animated Shirt Tales cartoon featured Tyg Tiger (in orange), Pammy Panda (in pink), Digger Mole (in light blue), Rick Raccoon (in red), and Bogey Orangutan (in green) (so-called because he spoke using a Humphrey Bogart-style voice). They lived in Oak Tree Park and wore shirts that flashed various brightly lit messages which reflected the characters' thoughts. They spent their time teasing the park custodian, Mr. Dinkel, and battling crime in and out of their hometown of Mid City. They zipped around the world in a vehicle known as the STSST (Shirt Tales' SuperSonic Transport) which could operate as a car, jet, boat, submarine, and other forms of transportation. Though most law enforcement agencies like the unnamed Commissioner knew of the Shirt Tales as crime fighters by reputation, few people seemed aware that they were talking animals—including Mr. Dinkel, whom the group often had to trick to keep their secret safe.

Each episode was divided into two 11–minute segments. After the success of the thirteen episodes in Season 1, ten episodes were created for Season 2.  However, the show was semi-rebooted and Kip Kangaroo (in light yellow) was added to the cast of characters without context for her joining the Shirt Tales. There is also a difference in leadership among the Shirt Tales, in which for the first season Rick appeared to be the de facto leader, but in the second season is instead Tyg. Several stories in Season 2 either omit Rick altogether or give him a minor role in the story. The second season also added some superhero elements to the dynamic of the group as well, most notably the color of all their T-shirts changing to a bright red color when "Shirt Tale Time" is called for.

Buck Beaver (in whitish-blue) helped the Shirt Tales use a tree as a bridge in "The Big Foot Incident" and helped them build an ark in "Dinkel's Ark". In "Moving Time", four cousins from out west were introduced for this episode only: Prairie Dog Pete (in red, with a black vest), Filmore Coyote (in light green), Violette Skunk (in yellow) and Hoozit Owl (in lavender). In "Back to Nature", Cubby Bear (in red) helped the Shirt Tales when a wild bear had Mr. Dinkel chased up a tree.

Following the initial run on NBC, Shirt Tales aired on CBS during the 1984–1985 Saturday morning season, replacing The Biskitts in their time slot. CBS aired selected episodes from its two-season NBC run until March 23, 1985, when The Biskitts were returned to the time slot for the rest of the 1984–1985 season.

On March 23, 1985, Shirt Tales was pulled from broadcast television for good, and the Hallmark franchise faded not long after as well. The show continued for a number of years as part of USA Network's Cartoon Express block and on Cartoon Network, but also continues to be broadcast in selected countries around the world on various networks, including Boomerang.

Voice cast

Main

 Nancy Cartwright – Kip Kangaroo (Season 2 only)
 Robert Allen Ogle – Digger Mole
 Patricia Parris – Pammy Panda
 Steve Schatzberg – Tyg Tiger, Rick Raccoon (Episode 4 only)
 Ronnie Schell – Rick Raccoon
 Fred Travalena – Bogey Orangutan
 Herb Vigran – Mr. Dinkel
 William Woodson – Commissioner (Season 1 only)

Additional Voices

 Richard Balin (Season 1) 
 Joe Besser (Season 1) – Elmo the Elephant (in "Elephant on the Loose")
 Joey Camen (Season 2) 
 Victoria Carroll (Season 2) 
 Brian Cummings 
 Walker Edmiston (Season 1) 
 Marshall Efron (Season 1) 
 Bernard Erhard (Season 2) 
 Ernest Harada (Season 2) 
 Bob Holt (Season 2) 
 Buster Jones (Season 2) 
 Stanley Jones (Season 1) 
 Sherry Lynn (Season 1) 
 Tress MacNeille (Season 1) 
 Kenneth Mars (Season 1) 
 Joseph Medalis (Season 1) 
 Howard Morris (Season 2) – Shutter McBugg (in "Double Exposure")
 Henry Polic II (Season 1) 
 Tony Pope 
 Robert Ridgely (Season 1) 
 Michael Rye (Season 1) 
 Marilyn Schreffler 
 Rick Segall (Season 1) 
 Michael Sheehan (Season 1) 
 Hal Smith 
 John Stephenson (Season 1) – Game Master (in "The Game Masters"), Museum Tour Guide (in "The Humboldt Ghost"), The Humboldt Ghost (in "The Humboldt Ghost"), Ebenezer Creepling (in "The Humboldt Ghost")
 Andre Stojka (Season 1) 
 Jimmy Weldon (Season 2) 
 Frank Welker (Season 1) – Figby the Cat (in "Figby, the Spoiled Brat Cat")
 Ted Zeigler (Season 1)

Episodes

Season 1 (1982–83)

Season 2 (1983–84)

Other media
There were also two musical book-and-record sets released by K-tel International under the "Castle Rock" imprint: A Song Saves the Park, and Sunrise Surprise. However, both sets use sound-alikes for the voices, and are presented differently from typical read-alongs.

Home media
In 1986, a VHS release of the series was issued by Worldvision Home Video and Kids Klassics, it contained the first full-length episode from Season 2 and the first segment of another episode from that season.

On September 16, 2014, Warner Archive released Shirt Tales: The Complete Series on DVD in Region 1 as part of their Hanna–Barbera Classics Collection.

References

External links
 

1982 American television series debuts
1984 American television series endings
1980s American animated television series
English-language television shows
NBC original programming
Television series by Hanna-Barbera
Animated television series about apes
Television series about kangaroos and wallabies
Television series about pandas
Television series about raccoons
Television series about tigers
CBS original programming
Hallmark Cards
American children's animated adventure television series
American children's animated fantasy television series